Ratu Kadavulevu School is a school in Lodoni, Fiji. It has some 900 students and is one of the largest boarding schools in the country. Its students are multiracial, but predominantly Indigenous Fijians.

The school was founded in 1924 as the Provincial School Eastern by high chief Ratu Penaia Kadavulevu and was later renamed in his honor.

Ratu Kadavulevu School consists of four houses: RATU SUKUNA (Red), MAAFU (Blue), DEGEI (Yellow), CAKAU (Green).

Notable alumni
Ilaitia Tuisese - Captain of Fiji Rugby 7s Team to Hong Kong 1977, Fiji Rugby Hall of Fame Inductee
Bole, Filipe - Former Minister for Education
Luke Daunivalu - Ambassador and Deputy Permanent Representative of Fiji to the UN
 Nakaitaci, Noa - Current French rugby winger
 Qarase, Laisenia - Former Prime Minister
 Sauturaga, Vereniki - Former Flying Fijians Frontrower
Isi Naisarani - Melbourne Rebels Current Wallabies Number 8
 Rabeni, Seru - Former Flying Fijians centre
 Rawaqa, Turuva - Flying Fijians lock
 Ducivaki, Mosese - Flying Fijians Frontrower
 Veitokani, Alivereti - Flying Fijians Fullback
 Veitayaki, Joeli - Flying Fijians Frontrower
 Tagicakibau, Luke - Flying Fijians Frontrower
 Nagusa, Timoci - Former Flying Fijians Utility Back
 Nagusa, Nemani - Flying Fijians Utility
 Sivivatu, Sitiveni - Former All Blacks wing
 Waqa, Sisa- Former Melbourne Storm and Canberra Raiders  wing
 Talemaitoga, Tuapati- Flying Fijians Hooker
 Kenatale, Nemia- Flying Fijians Halfback
 Seniloli, Henry- Flying Fijians Halfback
 Dominiko Waqaniburotu - Current Flying Fijians Captain
 Jone Naqica - Former USA Eagles, USA 7s Captain 
 Paula Dranisinikula - Current Fiji 7s Captain
 Viliame Mata - Flying Fijians Flanker
 Nat Saumi - Former Flying Fijians Rep, Rugby Director RKS

References

External links 
 RKS Social Network Website
 RKSOSA website

Educational institutions established in 1924
Schools in Fiji
1924 establishments in Fiji